Immaculate Conception High School is a Roman Catholic co-educational college preparatory high school located in Montclair, in Essex County, New Jersey, United States. The school operates under the supervision of the Roman Catholic Archdiocese of Newark. The school has been accredited by the Middle States Association of Colleges and Schools Commission on Elementary and Secondary Schools since 1957.

Immaculate Conception High School was established in 1925 as a parish school under the guidance of its founder, Rev. Edward M. Farrel. The Sisters of Charity of Saint Elizabeth began their connection to the school with the appointment of Mother Mary Alexandrine as the school's first principal.

Per its mission statement, Immaculate Conception High School "strives, within the context of family to develop the whole person: morally, intellectually, emotionally, and physically, recognizing the work and uniqueness of each individual".

As of the 2013–14 school year, the school had an enrollment of 179 students and 24.4 classroom teachers (on an FTE basis), for a student–teacher ratio of 7.3:1. The school's enrollment was 1.7% White, 78.2% Black, 17.9% Hispanic, 0.6% Asian and 1.7% two or more races.

History
By 2014, the school had debts of $900,000. That year NJ.com reported that the school "is fighting to stay open." Fundraisers that year generated about $500,000 helped to ensure the school's survival. The necessary money was generated in approximately one month.

Athletics
The Immaculate Conception High School Lions compete in the Super Essex Conference, which is comprised of public and private high schools in Essex County and operates under the supervision of the New Jersey State Interscholastic Athletic Association (NJSIAA). Prior to the 2010 realignment of the NJSIAA, the school had previously participated in the Colonial Hills Conference; which included schools in Essex, Morris and Somerset counties in west Central Jersey. With 170 students in grades 10–12, the school was classified by the NJSIAA for the 2019–20 school year as Non-Public B for most athletic competition purposes, which included schools with an enrollment of 37 to 366 students in that grade range (equivalent to Group I for public schools). The football team competes in the United Blue division of the North Jersey Super Football Conference, which includes 112 schools competing in 20 divisions, making it the nation's biggest football-only high school sports league. The school was classified by the NJSIAA as Non-Public Group II for football for 2018–2020.

The boys basketball team won the Non-Public Group C state championship in 1978, defeating Sacred Heart High School by a score of 53–51 in the tournament finals.

The boys track team won the spring track title in Non-Public B in 1980–1984, 1986–1988, 1998 and 2005. The program's 10 state titles are tied for eighth-most in the state.

The 1983 softball team finished the season with a 16–10 record after winning the Non-Public group B state championship in 1983, with a 9–6 victory against runner-up Gloucester Catholic High School in the finals.

The girls team won the NJSIAA spring track state championship in Non-Public B in 1991.

The football team won the Non-Public B South state sectional championship in 1994 and the Non-Public Group I title in 1998. The 1994 team finished the season 11–0 after winning the Non-Public B South title against four-time defending champion St. Joseph High School by s score of 20–6 in the tournament final.

Dominique Booker won the 55 meter dash at the 2009 Meet of Champions with a time of 6.92 seconds, setting a meet record that was also the fastest time in the nation for the event that year. At the 2011 Meet of Champions, Mirabel Nkenke won a silver medal with a time of 56.21 in the 400 meter dash, setting a school record for the event.

Notable alumni
 Tom Ammiano (born 1941), politician and LGBT rights activist who served as a member of the California State Assembly and on the San Francisco Board of Supervisors.
 Rich Kenah (born 1970), middle-distance runner who represented the United States at the 2000 Summer Olympics in Sydney.
 Jose L. Linares (born 1953), former Chief United States district judge of the United States District Court for the District of New Jersey.
 Naturi Naughton (born 1984), actress and singer-songwriter who was one-third of the R&B trio 3LW.
 Ron Simpson, former professional basketball player.
 Ben Sirmans (born 1970), American football coach and former running back who is the running backs coach for the Green Bay Packers of the National Football League.

References

External links 
 Immaculate Conception High School website
 Data for Immaculate Conception High School, National Center for Education Statistics

1925 establishments in New Jersey
Educational institutions established in 1925
Middle States Commission on Secondary Schools
Montclair, New Jersey
Private high schools in Essex County, New Jersey
Roman Catholic Archdiocese of Newark
Catholic secondary schools in New Jersey